HMS Hibernia was a 110-gun first-rate ship of the line of the Royal Navy. She was launched at Plymouth dockyard on 17 November 1804, and was the only ship built to her draught, designed by Sir John Henslow.

On 11 January 1806, Hibernia capsized in the "Wembury River" — probably a reference to the River Yealm off Wembury, Devon, England — with the loss of 19 of her crew. She was later refloated, repaired, and returned to service.

Between 1807 and 1808, Hibernia, under the command of Sir William Sidney Smith, led the British escort of the Portuguese Royal Family during the transfer of the Portuguese Court to Brazil.

Hibernia was flagship of the British Mediterranean Fleet from 1816 until 1855, when she became the flagship for the Royal Navy's base at Malta and stationed in Grand Harbour. She remained in this role until she was sold in 1902.

After the Napoleonic Wars ended in 1815, HMS Hibernia was used in the service of the British Empire in other ways, such as to transport convicts to the colony of New South Wales. In 1818–1819, for example, the ship carried 160 male convicts to Sydney from Portsmouth sailing on 20 November and arriving 18 June. Also on board as passengers were the first Minister of St James' Church, Sydney, Richard Hill and his wife.

The ten-day court-martial of the surviving officers and crewmen of the battleship  for the loss of their ship in a 22 June 1893 collision with the battleship  was held on Hibernias deck. The proceedings began on 17 July 1893.

Hibernia was sold in 1902 and broken up. Her timber ended up being used to fire bakeries in Malta, leading to an outbreak of lead poisoning on the island. A statue of the Virgin Mary, in her mantle as Queen of Heaven, was carved from a section of the ship's main mast and can be seen in the Collegiate Parish Church of St Paul's Shipwreck in Valletta. Her figurehead is now displayed at the Malta Maritime Museum, which is housed in the former Royal Naval Bakery building in Birgu, Malta.

Notes

References

 Hough, Richard. Admirals in Collision. New York: Viking Press, 1959. Library of Congress Card Catalog Number 59-13415.
 Lavery, Brian (2003) The Ship of the Line - Volume 1: The development of the battlefleet 1650-1850. Conway Maritime Press. .

External links
 

Ships of the line of the Royal Navy
1804 ships
Ships built in England
Maritime incidents in 1806
Shipwrecks of England